The Dover Boys at Pimento University; or, The Rivals of Roquefort Hall (also known as The Dover Boys) is a 1942 Warner Bros. Merrie Melodies cartoon directed by Chuck Jones. The short was released on September 19, 1942. The cartoon is a parody of the Rover Boys, a popular juvenile fiction book series of the early 20th century.

It is one of the first cartoons to make extensive use of limited animation, as well as other techniques that would only be more broadly popularized in the 1950s. Animation historian Michael Barrier writes: "Is The Dover Boys the first 'modern' cartoon? …Chuck Jones stylized the animation in this cartoon in a way that anticipated what several consciously modern studios like UPA would be doing a decade later."

In 1994, the cartoon was voted No. 49 of The 50 Greatest Cartoons of all time by members of the animation field.

Plot

The scene descends upon Pimento University ("good old P.U."), and the school anthem is sung in a 1910s barbershop style.

The narrator then introduces the three inseparable Dover brothers: athletic oldest brother Tom (on a tandem bicycle with a perpetual wheelie), middle child Dick (on a self-propelled penny-farthing whose pedals are too far away for Dick to reach), and portly, curly-haired youngest brother Larry (on a tricycle). "A gay outing at the park has been planned by the merry trio, and they are off to fetch 'their' fiancée, dainty Dora Standpipe, at Miss Cheddar's Female Academy, close by."

The Boys are called upon to rescue Dora when she is kidnapped by the nefarious stock villain Dan Backslide. "The former sneak of Roquefort Hall, coward, bully, cad, and thief, and arch-enemy of the Dover Boys," his feelings for Dora are summed up in his comment, "How I love her! … (father's money!)" Backslide then steals a conveniently placed, unoccupied runabout (after loudly declaring his intention to do so, claiming that "No one will ever know!"), which he uses to kidnap an oblivious Dora while she and the Dover Boys are playing hide-and-seek, spiriting her away to a remote mountain lodge. But Backslide soon discovers that, despite appearances, Dora is anything but dainty; she proceeds to administer a sound thrashing to the villain, all the while acting the damsel in distress—crying for help and pounding on the door (with the locks on her side) and on Backslide—until he is himself crying out for help from Tom, Dick, and Larry.

Although the boys had heard Dora's cries for help, it is not until "an alert young scout" witnesses Dora's captivity, then sends a distress signal via semaphore, then via telegram, to the boys that they respond by breaking the messenger's tandem bike into three unicycles and race to the scene. When the Dover Boys finally arrive, they lay a few punches on the by-now barely conscious Backslide before managing to knock each other out in unison as Backslide collapses to the floor safely beneath their swinging fists. Dora is then escorted away by an odd grey-bearded man in a nineteenth-century bathing suit and sailor's cap who was a running gag throughout the cartoon, appearing periodically to interrupt the story by shuffling across the screen to the tune of Ed Haley's "While Strolling Through the Park One Day". He and Dora proceed to shuffle off into the sunset as the cartoon concludes with a Silent-Film era iris out.

Production

According to Jones, Schlesinger and the Warner Bros. studio executives were less than pleased when they screened The Dover Boys because of the extensive use of limited animation and drybrush smears, and the executives went through the process of attempting to fire him despite the fact that the studio wanted him to abandon his Disney-like animation. A replacement for Jones could not be easily found due to labor shortages stemming from World War II, so he was kept aboard. The short is one of the earliest examples of limited animation being used, and was "wholly unlike the animation of contemporary films".

From time to time throughout the cartoon, the Boys lapse into various renditions of their alma mater, bearing resemblance to "The Rose of No Man's Land" and George Cooper and Henry Tucker's "Sweet Genevieve": "Pimento U, Oh sweet P.U., thy fragrant odor scents the air" etc.

The entire cartoon is filled with puns on the Rover Boys series: The occurrences of the names Pimento, Cheddar, and Roquefort reflect the Rover Boys' old school of Colby Hall; Tom, Dick and Larry borrow their names from Tom, Sam and Dick Rover (as well as the generic names Tom, Dick and Harry), Dora Standpipe is named after Tom Rover's fiancée Dora Stanhope, and Dan Backslide is named after Rover Boys villain Dan Baxter.

Although voice credits from Warner Bros. cartoons are not easy to find beyond Mel Blanc (who, using more or less his normal voice, portrays Dan Backslide and the telegram delivery boy), it is assumed that John McLeish voiced the part of the narrator (he performed a similar role as the stately, unctuous narrator on several Goofy shorts for the Disney studio). The voice of Tom Dover was performed by long-time Termite Terrace writer Tedd Pierce, who also provided the story. Vocal harmonies were provided by The Sportsmen Quartet, from Jack Benny's radio program. Dora was voiced by Marjorie Tarlton. Dan Backslide's character design was a caricature of Jones' animator Ken Harris. McLeish also narrated the cartoon The Rocky Road to Ruin of Color Rhapsody from Columbia Pictures and Screen Gems, adding to the similarity between it and The Dover Boys on top of similar character design and what was then called the "modern" visual style of cartoons, which evolved into the UPA style.

Legacy
The characters Tom, Dick, and Larry later made cameo appearances (voiced respectively by Jon Bauman, Jeff Bennett and Rob Paulsen) on the 1990s Fox and WB network series Animaniacs, alongside Slappy Squirrel in "Frontier Slappy", while singing discrediting lyrics about Daniel Boone (voiced by Jim Cummings) until they get fired by him, the Warners in "Magic Time", and in Wakko's Wish. A short clip of this cartoon is featured in the opening credits of "Less Than Hero", an episode of another Fox TV show, Futurama. They also appeared cheering in the stands late in the 1996 animation/live-action movie Space Jam. A segment of the cartoon is featured briefly in an episode of Agent Carter where it is used as part of a subliminal messaging tool of the Black Widow program.

With the advent of the Internet, the short gained newfound attention from younger generations, in part because it is one of the few Warner Bros. shorts from that era that fell into the public domain, although it has seen releases from MGM/UA Home Video and Warner Home Video. The younger generation were drawn to the animation style, absurd and non sequitur humor, and the satire of the 1910s. The cartoon has led to many internet memes as a result, one being Dan's quote "A runabout? I'll steal it! No one will ever know!".

In 2018, to mark the short's 76th anniversary, a collaborative effort of over 90 independent animators recreated the short scene for scene with each animator drawing in their own style. The reanimated collaboration, titled “The Dover Boys Reanimated Collab!”, was curated by animator Josh 'Zeurel' Palmer and was released on August 27, 2018, on YouTube, receiving nearly three million views.

See also
Looney Tunes and Merrie Melodies filmography (1940–1949)
List of animated films in the public domain in the United States

References

External links
 
 
 

1942 films
1942 animated films
1940s animated short films
1940s parody films
Merrie Melodies short films
Warner Bros. Cartoons animated short films
Short films directed by Chuck Jones
Films set in universities and colleges
Articles containing video clips
Films scored by Carl Stalling
American parody films
Films produced by Leon Schlesinger
1942 comedy films
1940s Warner Bros. animated short films
Internet memes
Film and television memes